Spears is the 1985 debut album by fusion band Tribal Tech, a project led by guitarist Scott Henderson and bassist Gary Willis.

Track listing
All songs written by Scott Henderson, except "Tribal" by Scott Henderson and Gary Willis.
"Caribbean" – 8:13
"Punkin Head" – 6:10
"Ivy Towers" – 4:49
"Tribal" – 2:12
"Spears" – 7:10
"Island City Shuttle" – 7:28
"Big Fun" – 7:58

Personnel
 Scott Henderson - Guitars
 Pat Coil - Keyboards
 Gary Willis - Bass
 Steve Houghton - Drums
 Brad Dutz - Percussion
 Bob Sheppard - Sax, Flute

Production
Executive Producer: Brad Dutz
Arranged & Produced By Scott Henderson
Recorded & Mixed By Alan R. Hirschberg, with assistance by John Guggenheim
Mastered By Steve Hall at Future Disc
All Songs Published By Mango Prom Music

References

1985 debut albums
Tribal Tech albums
Albums produced by Scott Henderson